The Yecua Formation is a geological Formation in what is now Bolivia. Studies suggest that the Yecua Formation preserves a coastal setting with humid to semiarid floodplains, shorelines and tidal as well as shallow marine environments including marshes, streams, lakes and brackish bodies of water. There may have been a connection to the Amazon Basin or the Paranaense Sea.

Bivalves

Gastropods

Crustaceans

Vertebrates

References

Geologic formations of Bolivia
Miocene Series of South America
Huayquerian
Chasicoan
Mayoan
Laventan
Friasian
Colloncuran
Neogene Bolivia
Fossiliferous stratigraphic units of South America
Paleontology in Bolivia
Sandstone formations
Mudstone formations
Lacustrine deposits